This timeline of Apple products is a list of all computers, phones, tablets, wearables, and other products sold by Apple Inc. This list is ordered by the release date of the products. Macintosh Performa models were often physically identical to other models, in which case they are omitted in favor of the identical twin.

Detailed timeline

1970s

1980-1983

1984

1985

1986

1987

1988

1989

1990

1991

1992

1993

1994

1995

1996

1997

1998

1999

2000

2001

2002

2003

2004

2005

2006

2007

2008

2009

2010

2011

2012

2013

2014

2015

2016

2017

2018

2019

2020

2021

2022

2023

See also 
 Macintosh
 List of Macintosh models grouped by CPU type
 List of iOS and iPadOS devices
 Timeline of the Apple II family
 Timeline of Macintosh models

References

External links
 Specifications, Apple Computer, Inc.
 Mac Systems: Apple, EveryMac.com
 Glen Sanford, Apple History, apple-history.com
 Dan Knight, Computer Profiles, LowEndMac, Cobweb Publishing, Inc.
 Steven Weyhrich, Apple II History, apple2history.org
 Pictorial Timeline

Apple Inc. hardware
Apple products
Apple
products